Pooka or Púca is a faery creature of Celtic folklore.

Pooka may also refer to
Pooka (band), British pop duo
Pooka!, a 2018 film
Pooka, a race of rabbit-like beings in Odin Sphere
Pooka, an enemy in Dig Dug
Pooka, a fictional dog in Anastasia
Pooka, a kith in Changeling: The Dreaming
Pooka Williams Jr., American football player 
an invisible rabbit in the
 1944 play Harvey by Mary Chase
 1950 movie Harvey based on the play